Travis Shane Taylor (born July 24, 1968, in Decatur, Alabama) is an American scientist, engineer, science fiction author, and the star of National Geographic Channel's Rocket City Rednecks which aired 2011–2013. Taylor has written numerous technical papers, science fiction novels, and two textbooks. He has appeared in television documentaries, including NGC's When Aliens Attack and starring as the lead investigator in History Channel's The Secret of Skinwalker Ranch.

Early and family life
Travis Shane Taylor was born July 24, 1968, in Decatur, Alabama in North Alabama. His father, Charles Taylor, worked as a machinist at Wyle Laboratories, which subcontracted for National Aeronautics and Space Administration (NASA) in the 1960s.
As a boy, Taylor read science fiction and dismantled household electronics.
While in high school, Taylor's family moved to Somerville, near Huntsville. 
At 17 years old, with the help of his neighbor, he built a radio telescope that won the state science fair. 
This led the Army to offer Taylor a job working at Redstone Arsenal on direct energy weapons systems directly out of high school as well as a scholarship. 

Taylor lives near Huntsville with his wife Karen, daughter Kalista Jade, two dogs Stevie and Wesker, and his cat Kuro.

Education and research career
Taylor earned a B.S. in electrical engineering from Auburn University in 1991, before going on to study at University of Alabama, Huntsville where he earned a MS in physics in 1994, a PhD in optical science and engineering in 1999, and a MSE in mechanical and aerospace engineering in 2001. He then completed a MS in astronomy in 2004 at the University of Western Sydney before earning a second PhD from University of Alabama, Huntsville in aerospace engineering in 2012.

By 2006, Taylor had worked on various programs for the United States Department of Defense and NASA for over sixteen years. He has researched several advanced propulsion concepts, very large space telescopes, space-based beamed energy systems, high-energy lasers, and next generation space launch concepts. Taylor has also been involved with Human intelligence (HUMINT), Imagery intelligence (IMINT), Signals intelligence (SIGINT) and Measurement and signature intelligence (MASINT) concept studies.

Taylor was briefly the informal chief scientist on the Unidentified Aerial Phenomena Task Force. He is also a Principal Research Scientist at Radiance Technologies.

Science fiction
According to Taylor, after he expressed his dissatisfaction with space opera and the comparative dearth of recent hard science fiction, he was challenged by his wife to write his first book, and studied Robert A. Heinlein's works for stylistic influence.

Television 
Taylor first appeared in episodes of The Universe and Life After People for the History Channel in 2010, after his name came up in a search regarding space warfare. Taylor was then on National Geographic Channel's When Aliens Attack in 2011.

In the summer of 2011, the National Geographic Channel announced a new series called Rocket City Rednecks which features Taylor.  The first episode showed in September 2011. A self-proclaimed 'redneck rocket scientist', Taylor focuses on 'hillbilly ingenuity' for the show's backyard science experiments, aided by his family and best friend, who are all machinists and inventors. The show ran for two seasons, from September 2011 to January 2013.

In 2015, he hosted the series "3 Scientists Walk into a Bar", which had four episodes in 2015. From 2017 he appeared on the History Channel show Ancient Aliens, starting in the Season 12 episode "Voices of the Gods," and following with appearances in 28 episodes through season 18. Additional History Channel appearances were on The Tesla Files and The Curse of Oak Island in 2019.  Taylor led a 2020 History Channel series focusing on mysteries at Skinwalker Ranch, Utah, United States, in which he and a team investigated potential paranormal phenomena, with a second and third season in 2021 and 2022.
On other networks, he appeared in episodes of In Search of Monsters and NASA's Unexplained Files.

Filmography

Bibliography

Fiction

Nonfiction books

Footnotes

References

External links
 Travis S. Taylor on Baen Books (archived)
 

 

1968 births
20th-century American male writers
21st-century American male writers
21st-century American novelists
21st-century American short story writers
American male novelists
American science fiction writers
American male short story writers
Auburn University alumni
Living people
NASA people
Participants in American reality television series
People from Decatur, Alabama
University of Alabama in Huntsville alumni
Western Sydney University alumni